Tidal Eyes is the first full-length studio album by American indie band The Queen Killing Kings. It was released on July 17, 2009 by Wind-up Records.

Track listing
 "Dark Hearts" – 3:17
 "Reinventing Language" – 3:33
 "Like Lions" – 3:56
 "Ivory" – 2:47
 "Strangers in Love" – 3:04
 "Naked in the Rain" – 2:28
 "Birds with Iron Wings" – 2:51
 "Warden" – 3:33
 "Into the Woods" – 2:49
 "The Streets" – 3:16
 "This Night" – 4:05

Personnel
 Coley O'Toole
 Joe Ballaro
 Dan Duggins
 Zac Clark

Notes
Recorded at Pyramid Studios in Manhattan.

2009 albums